Beekman is a Dutch toponymic surname, literally translating as "creek man". Variant forms are Beeckman and Beekmans. The Estonian poet Vladimir Beekman's family originally carried the name Peekmann. People with the surname include:

People

Beekman family of New York
Prominent descendants of the Beekman family originally of Overijssel, Netherlands:
 Wilhelmus Beekman (1623-1707), Treasurer of the Dutch West India Company, Governor of Delaware and Pennsylvania, 1653/58-1663
Gerardus Beekman (1653–1723), colonel, surgeon, Governor of the Province of New York

Other people with the surname
 Aimée Beekman (born 1933), Estonian writer, wife of Vladimir
 Allan Beekman (1913–2001), American reporter and author
 Anton Albert Beekman (1854–1947), Dutch geographer
 Augustus A. Beekman (1923-2008), New York City fire commissioner
 Cornelius C. Beekman (1828–1915), American banker in Jacksonville, Oregon
  (1919–2010), Dutch World War II resistance fighter, husband of Yolande
 Josh Beekman (born 1983), American football player and coach
 Marcel Beekman (born 1969), Dutch tenor
 Vladimir Beekman (1929–2009), Estonian writer, poet and translator, husband of Aimée
 Yolande Beekman (1911–1944), World War II heroine, wife of Jaap
Beekmans
 Gerard Beekmans (born 1979), Dutch programmer 
 Paul Beekmans (born 1982), Dutch footballer

Given name
 Beekman Du Barry (1828–1901), United States Army Brigadier General
 Beekman V. Hoffman (1789–1834), United States Navy officer
 Beekman Winthrop (1874–1940), American Governor of Puerto Rico 1909–13
 Garry Beekman Trudeau (born 1948), American cartoonist
 Henry Beekman Livingston (1748–1828), American poet

Places and buildings 
All named after descendants of Willem Beekman:
 Beekman, New York, a town in Dutchess County named after Hendrick Beekman (1652-1716), son of Willem
 Beekman Fire District
 Beekman Park
 Beekman Corners, New York, community now part of Sharon, New York
 Beekmantown, New York, a town in Clinton County, New York
 Beekman Place (Manhattan), street that was the site of the Beekman family mansion, Mount Pleasant
 The Beekman, previously known as Beekman Tower, a skyscraper designed by Frank Gehry, New York
 Beekman (Panhellenic) Tower, skyscraper designed by John Mead Howels (constructed 1927–29), New York
 Beekman Downtown Hospital or Lower Manhattan Hospital, New York
 Beekman Peninsula of Baffin Island, named after James W. Beekman, of New York
 Beekman Native Plant Arboretum, in Oregon, named after Cornelius C. Beekman

See also 
 Beeckman, variant spelling of the same name
 Chris Klein-Beekman (1971-2003), Canadian aid worker
 Beakman's World, a children's educational TV series

References

Dutch-language surnames
Dutch toponymic surnames